Ustad Ahmad Gul is a Pakistani Pashto folk and ghazal singer.

References

External links
 

Pakistani folk singers
Living people
1942 births